Mario Van Peebles (born January 15, 1957) is a Mexican-born American film director and actor best known for directing and starring in New Jack City in 1991 and USS Indianapolis: Men of Courage in 2016. He is the son of actor and filmmaker Melvin Van Peebles, whom he portrayed in the 2003 biopic Baadasssss!, which he also co-wrote and directed.

Early life and education
Mario Van Peebles was born in Mexico City, Mexico, the son of writer, director, actor and musician Melvin Van Peebles and Maria Marx.

He travelled often with his parents between Europe and the USA.

He majored in economics at Columbia College, the undergraduate division of Columbia University. He was invited to speak as the Class Day Speaker as part of the annual commencement exercises in 2021.

Career

1968 to 1971: First roles
Van Peebles' first screen appearance was in 1968, in the soap opera One Life to Live.

In 1971, he appeared in the film Sweet Sweetback's Baadasssss Song, Melvin Van Peebles directed and played the lead role and Mario played his father's character as a child. The film became a hit and a historical American film, because it was widely credited with showing Hollywood that a viable black audience existed and thus influenced the creation of the Blaxploitation genre. That year, Mario acted in a TV movie called Crosscurrent.

For the rest of the decade, he did not appear in other productions.

1981 to 1985: Subsequent roles and first lead
In 1981, Van Peebles acted in the miniseries The Sophisticated Gents.

He appeared in the action film Exterminator 2 (1984), as the main villain against its protagonist, played by Robert Ginty. When the production wrapped, the producers were unhappy and wanted a re-shoot. They replaced the original director, but the main star was no longer available so they made Van Peebles' character more central.

That same year, Van Peebles appeared as a dancer in Francis Ford Coppola's movie The Cotton Club.

In 1985, he landed his first leading role in the film Rappin' as Rappin' John Hood, an ex-convict who attempts to save his neighborhood from developers and hoodlums.

1985 to 1991: continued acting career and early directorial effort to breakthrough 
In 1985 he played in the comedy Delivery Boys, was one of the central characters in the action drama South Bronx Heroes, and acted in the dramatic TV film Children of the Night and one episode of the Cosby Show.

In 1986, he acted in the urban action film 3:15, the comedy Last Resort, the TV film D.C. Cops, four episodes of L.A. Law, and the Clint Eastwood military film Heartbreak Ridge based on the United States Marine Corps.

In 1987, he played in the sport film Hotshot, the TV film The Facts of Life Down Under, and Jaws: The Revenge, the fourth installment of the Jaws franchise.

In 1988, Van Peebles played the lead in the short-lived detective show Sonny Spoon. The show ran for two brief seasons, both of which aired in 1988 before the series was canceled. The show would mark his directorial debut, for which he tackled the task for one episode. That same year, he also acted in the TV film The Child Saver.

In 1989, he directed for the show Top of the Hill, three episodes of 21 Jump Street, two of which he acted in, and an episode of the TV series Wiseguy.

He also acted in one episode of American Playwrights Theater: The One-Acts, and the film Identity Crisis directed by his father.

At the beginning of the 1990s he performed in the TV film Blue Bayou and one episode of In Living Color.

Van Peebles directed Malcolm Takes a Shot, a 1991 CBS Schoolbreak Special about an aspiring high-school basketball star whose obstacles include epilepsy and his own arrogance. Van Peebles appeared in the special in a cameo appearance as the main character's doctor. He was nominated for a DGA Award by the Directors Guild of America for "Outstanding Directorial Achievement in Dramatic Shows".

He made his feature film directorial debut in 1991 with the black gangster film New Jack City, in which he also co-stars. Other lead actors are Wesley Snipes, Ice-T and Judd Nelson. New Jack City was produced with an estimated $8,000,000 budget.

The film premiered at the Sundance Film Festival on January 17, 1991, before being released nationally on March 8, 1991. Well received by critics, it grossed $7,039,622 during its opening weekend, and was the highest grossing independent film of 1991, grossing a total of $47,624,253 domestically.

That same year, he directed one episode of Gabriel's Fire and acted in the TV film A Triumph of the Heart: The Ricky Bell Story.

1992 to 2009: Subsequent success 
In 1992, he acted in two TV films: In the Line of Duty: Street War and Stompin' at the Savoy.

In 1993, he starred in and directed the black Western Posse, featuring a large ensemble cast including Woody Strode, Billy Zane, Tiny Lister, Tone Lōc, Big Daddy Kane, Robert Hooks, and many more. The film tells the story of a posse of black soldiers and one ostracized white soldier, who are all betrayed by a corrupt colonel.

That same year, he played in the science fiction crime film Full Eclipse.

In 1994, he collaborated twice with actor Christopher Lambert; they played the side by side leads in the action film Gunmen, and he was the main villain in Highlander III: The Sorcerer, the third installment of the Highlander film series. He also acted in a film called In the Living Years.

In 1995, he directed and co-starred in Panther based on a screenplay adapted by his father, Melvin Van Peebles, from his novel of the same name portraying the Black Panther Party for Self-Defense, tracing the organization from its founding through its decline in a compressed timeframe. Creative license is taken but the general trajectory of the Party and its experiences is factual. At the Locarno International Film Festival it won the prize of the Ecumenical Jury, a Silver Leopard, and was nominated for a Golden Leopard. At the Political Film Society it was nominated for a PFS Award.

In 1996, he acted in one episode of Living Single and one episode of HBO's Strangers. He also played the lead in the science fiction action film Solo. His directorial release that year was Gang in Blue, in which he stars and co-directs with his father who also has a role in the film. It's about a black police officer who discovers a cell of white supremacist vigilantes within his department.

In 1997, he acted in one episode of X-Files, and in the films Stag, Riot, and Los Locos, the first American film directed by Jean-Marc Vallée.

In 1998, he directed and starred in Love Kills, a comedy about a masseur who gets mixed up in the family plots at the mansion of a recently deceased Beverly Hills millionaire. He also appeared in the mini series Mama Flora's Family, Valentine's Day, and Killers in the House.

In 1999, he acted in Judgement Day, and Raw Nerve.

In 2000, Van Peebles acted in one episode of Martial Law and 20 episodes of Rude Awakening, he also appeared in the filmsSally Hemings: An American Scandal and Blowback.

In 2001, he starred in a film called Guardian, and co-starred in the Michael Mann film Ali for which he received a nomination for "Outstanding Supporting Actor" at the NAACP Image Awards.

In 2002, he acted in 10,000 Black Men Named George, two episodes of Robbery Homicide Division , and the TV movie Fiona.

In 2003, he acted in the film The Hebrew Hammer, 44 Minutes: The North Hollywood Shoot-Out, Gang of Roses, and The Street Lawyer.

His 2003 docudrama Baadasssss!, also known as How to Get the Man's Foot Outta Your Ass, opened at the Toronto International Film Festival. The film describes the making of his father's seminal film, Sweet Sweetback's Baadasssss Song. Mario directed the film as well as portraying his father in the lead role. The film was critically acclaimed and garnered numerous awards and nominations in the film festival circuits: it won "Best Feature Film" 2004 Philadelphia Film Festival and was nominated for Best Feature 2004 Gijón International Film Festival. At the 2005 Black Reel Awards, he was nominated for Best Actor, won Best Director, won Best Screenplay, and was nominated for Best Film, and the actress Joy Bryant was nominated Best Supporting Actress. Additionally, Van Peebles received three nominations at 2005 Independent Spirit Awards, and two nominations at 2005 NAACP Image Awards.

In 2004, he was a lead in the TV film Crown Heights and acted in one episode of Soul Food. In 2005, he acted in Carlito's Way: Rise to Power. In 2006, he directed and co-starred in the film Hard Luck, starring Wesley Snipes as the lead, and Cybill Shepherd was also in it. Snipes plays Lucky, a down on his luck former criminal and drug dealer whose post prison trials and tribulations take him on a wild adventure. In 2007, he acted in an episode of Law & Order and the film Sharpshooter. That year, he returned to directing for television starting with three episodes of Damages, in which he also had recurring role until 2009.

In 2008, he acted in his father's film Confessionsofa Ex-Doofus-ItchyFooted Mutha and 43 episodes of the soap opera All My Children. He returned to Law & Order as a director for three episodes. In 2009, Van Peebles and his family starred in the reality TV show Mario's Green House. He also acted in the film A Letter to Dad.

2010 to present day
In 2010, he acted in two films Multiple Sarcasms and Across the Line: The Exodus of Charlie Wright. He directed one episode of Lost, the documentary Fair Game?, and the film Redemption Road.

In 2011, he directed the sport drama All Things Fall Apart starring rapper/actor 50 cent in the title role playing a football player who suffers from a deadly disease; Van Peebles also played a role in this feature. Other acting credits that year were the films Tied to a Chair and 5th & Alameda, on TV, two episodes of Hellcats and two episodes of The Game, and he started to direct for the TV series Boss directing five episodes until 2012.
In 2012, he wrote, directed, and acted in "We the Party", a comedy set in an ethnically diverse Los Angeles high school. The film focuses on five friends as they deal with romance, money, prom, college, sex, bullies, Facebook, fitting in, standing out, and finding themselves. Also that year, he acted in one episode of The Finder and the feature film American Warship.

In 2013, he directed one episode NCIS: Naval Criminal Investigative Service, one episode of Monday Mornings, one episode of Zero Hour, and an episode of Nashville and in 2014 he directed two additional episodes of Nashville as well as acting in one, in 2015, he reprised his role with another director.

In 2014, Van Peebles wrote, directed, and acted in Red Sky, an action/thriller film starring Cam Gigandet, Shane West, and Rachael Leigh Cook. He also directed three episodes of Once Upon a Time, and that year, he acted in two other films Mantervention and Drumline: A New Beat.

In 2015, he directed one episode of The Last Ship, one episode of Chicago P.D., and two episodes of Empire.

In 2016, he directed another episode of Empire and two episodes of Being Mary Jane.

In 2016, he directed the film USS Indianapolis: Men of Courage, based largely on the true story of the loss of the ship in the closing stages of the Second World War and starring Nicolas Cage, Tom Sizemore, and Thomas Jane.

He directed one episode of Roots and acted in the feature film Submerged.

In 2017, he directed two additional episodes of Being Mary Jane and one episode of Hand of God. He also acted in the feature For Justice and in four episodes of Bloodline, one of which he also directed, and he directed an additional episode his character didn't appear in. That year, he created and produced the TV series Superstition, directed eight episodes, and acted in ten, and in some of them he performed both roles.

Activism 
In 2014 Van Peebles filmed a public service video supporting the District of Columbia statehood movement. His advocacy is part of DC Shadow Senator Paul Strauss’ “51 Stars" campaign which aims to enlist 51 celebrities to endorse making Washington, DC the 51st state.

Filmography

Film

Television

Director

21 Jump Street (1989–1990)
New Jack City (1991)
Posse (1993)
Panther (1995)
Gang in Blue (1996)
Love Kills (1998)
Baadasssss! (2003)
Hard Luck (2006)
Sons of Anarchy (2008) (Season 1, episode 10: "Better Half")
Law & Order (2008) (Season 19, episode 6: "Sweetie")
Damages (2008)
Lost (2010) (Season 6, episode 7: "Dr. Linus")
Redemption Road (2010)
Boss (2011) (Season 1, episodes 3, 6 and 8; Season 2, episodes 6 and 9)
All Things Fall Apart (2011)
We the Party (2012)
NCIS (2013) (Season 10, episode 16: "Detour")
Monday Mornings (2013)
Zero Hour (2013)
Nashville (2013) (Season 2, episode 7: "She's Got You")
Once Upon a Time (2014) (Season 3, episode 16); (Season 4, episodes 6 and 10)
Red Sky (2014)
Empire (2015) (Season 1, episode 11: "Die But Once")
The Last Ship (2015) (Season 2, episode 10: "Friendly Fire")
USS Indianapolis: Men of Courage (2016)
Roots (2016)
Bloodline (2017)
Superstition (2017)
Armed (2018)
Proven Innocent (2019) (Season 1, episode 5: “Cross To Bear”
Salt-N-Pepa (2021)
Power Book III: Raising Kanan (2021) (Season 1, episode 2: "Reaping and Sowing")
CSI: Vegas (2022) (Season 2, episode 6: "There's the Rub")
Wu-Tang: An American Saga(2023) (Season 3, episode 3: “Dirty Dancing”)

Actor (stage)
Waltz of the Stork (1982)

References

External links

1957 births
Living people
American male film actors
Actors from Mexico City
African-American film directors
African-American male actors
African-American male child actors
African-American television directors
American people of German descent
American film directors
American male child actors
American male television actors
American television directors
Columbia College (New York) alumni
English-language film directors
21st-century African-American people
20th-century African-American people
Mexican directors
Mexican male actors
Mexican people of African-American descent
Mexican people of German descent